Mosta Football Club is a Maltese football club from the town of Mosta. The team played four seasons in Malta's highest league 1974–75, 1987–88, 2002–03 and 2005–06. They achieved promotion to the Maltese Premier League again in 2010–11. .

Achievements
Maltese First Division 3rd Place (Promoted): 2010–11
Maltese First Division Champions: 1986–87
Maltese First Division Runners-up: 2001–02, 2004–05
Maltese Second Division Champions: 1984–85, 1992–93
Maltese Second Division Section Winners: 1978–79, 1992–93
Maltese Second Division Runners-up: 1973–74
Maltese Third Division Champions: 1964–65
Maltese Third Division Section Winners: 1968–69

Players

Current squad

Out on loan

European record

As of match played 15 July 2021

Notes
 QR: Qualifying round 4

Club Officials

Managers
 Oliver Spiteri (July 1, 2009 – Nov 16, 2011)
 Steve D'Amato (Nov 17, 2011 – Feb 13)
 Danilo Dončić (Feb 16, 2013 – Dec 24, 2013)
 Enrico Piccioni (Dec 24, 2013 – Nov 3, 2014)
 Peter Smith (Nov 10, 2014 – June 10, 2015)
 Mark Miller (sacked last season)
 Mario Muscat (current)

Women's team
The women's team of Mosta plays in the country's top division, the Maltese First Division. In 2010–11 it won its first championship and thus qualified to the 2011–12 UEFA Women's Champions League. The team was runners-up in the 1998 and 1999 Maltese Women's Cup and recently won the 2012 cup.

References

External links

 
Football clubs in Malta
Association football clubs established in 1935
1935 establishments in Malta
Sport in Mosta